
William C. Thalbitzer (5 February 1873 in Helsingør – 18 September 1958 in Usserød) was a Danish philologist and professor of Eskimo studies at the University of Copenhagen. He studied Danish, English and Latin at the university, but after graduating in 1899 he decided to focus on "exotic" languages. In 1900 he spent a year in Ilulissat in western Greenland studying the Greenlandic language. From 1905 to 1907 he with his wife spent eighteen months among the natives in Tasiilaq, one of the most isolated places on the coast of eastern Greenland. In 1920 the University of Copenhagen established a permanent lecture position for Thalbitzer in "Greenlandic (Eskimo) language and culture". In 1952 he was made an honorary doctor at the University of Copenhagen.

Publications 

 William Thalbitzer at Find in a Library

References

Notes

External links 
 William Thalbitzer, photographs from Greenland

1873 births
1958 deaths
Linguists from Denmark
Danish ethnologists
Linguists of Eskaleut languages
People from Helsingør
Eskimologists